Schalks Falls is a waterfall located in the Catskill Mountains of New York. It is located in the village of West Saugerties.

References

Waterfalls of New York (state)
Landforms of Ulster County, New York
Tourist attractions in Ulster County, New York